Priest Hill is a   nature reserve on the eastern outskirts of Epsom in Surrey. It is managed by the Surrey Wildlife Trust.

More than 1,500 tons of tarmac and rubble were cleared from these former playing fields to create a grassland nature reserve. Three ponds have been created and green hay from another reserve has been spread over some areas to introduce the seeds of wild flowers such as kidney vetch.

There is access from Reigate Road and Banstead Road. Some areas are closed to the public.

References

Surrey Wildlife Trust